Affton is a census-designated place (CDP) in south St. Louis County, Missouri, United States, near St. Louis. The population was 20,417 at the 2020 United States Census.

Geography
Affton is located at 38°33'4" North, 90°19'25" West (38.551052, -90.323614).

Demographics

2020 census
As of 2020, there were 20,417 people living in the area.

2000 census

As of the census of 2000, there were 20,535 people, 8,892 households, and 5,655 families residing in the CDP. The racial makeup of the CDP was 97.62% White, 0.06% Black, 0.01% American Indian, 1.30% Asian, 0.03% Pacific Islander, 0.28% from other races, and 1.13% from two or more races. 1.01% of the population were Hispanic or Latino of any race.

There were 8,892 households, out of which 26.5% had children under the age of 18 living with them, 51.1% were married couples living together, 9.5% had a female householder with no husband present, and 36.4% were non-families. 31.9% of all households were made up of individuals, and 14.0% had someone living alone who was 65 years of age or older. The average household size was 2.31 and the average family size was 2.93.

In the CDP, the population was spread out, with 21.9% under the age of 18, 6.9% from 18 to 24, 30.3% from 25 to 44, 21.4% from 45 to 64, and 19.5% who were 65 years of age or older. The median age was 40 years. For every 100 females, there were 89.1 males. For every 100 females age 18 and over, there were 85.0 males.

The median income for a household in the CDP was $43,327, and the median income for a family was $54,881. Males had a median income of $38,141 versus $28,397 for females. The per capita income for the CDP was $22,059. 3.6% of the population and 2.1% of families were below the poverty line. 3.9% of those under the age of 18 and 4.1% of those 65 and older were living below the poverty line.

Education
The Bayless School District, Lutheran High School South, Affton School District, and Holy Cross Academy (St. John Paul II campus) are all found in the area known as Affton.

Notable people
 Derek Blasberg, fashion writer, attended Affton High School
 Markus Golden, Arizona Cardinals football player, attended Affton High School
 John Goodman, actor, born and raised in Affton, attended Affton High School
 Kristeen Young, musician, raised in Affton
 Jack Dorsey, Twitter and Square co-founder, lived in Affton during childhood

References

External links
 Affton School District
 Affton Chamber of Commerce
 The Oakland House
 Bayless School District

Census-designated places in St. Louis County, Missouri
Census-designated places in Missouri